Pisser may refer to

 Toilet
 Urinal
Urination
 "Pisser", a song by I Mother Earth from Scenery and Fish

See also:
 Pissoir, a type of public urinal
 Pissoir (film), a 1988 film by John Greyson
 Pissa (disambiguation)
 Piss (disambiguation)